The 2017 Arkansas Razorbacks women's soccer team represented the University of Arkansas during the 2017 NCAA Division I women's soccer season. It was the 32nd season of the university fielding a program.  The Razorbacks played their home games at Razorback Field in Fayetteville.

Personnel

Roster

Coaching Staff

Schedule
Source:

|-
!colspan=8 style=""| Exhibition

|-
!colspan=8 style=""| Regular season

|-
!colspan=8 style=""| SEC Tournament

|-
!colspan=8 style=""| NCAA Tournament

References

Arkansas
Arkansas Razorbacks soccer, women's
Arkansas
Arkansas Razorbacks women's soccer seasons